This is a list of notable people from Muzaffargarh city and Muzaffargarh District.

Scholars
 Uday Bhanu Hans, State poet of Haryana
 Fazal Ali Qureshi
 Hafiz Riaz Hussain Najafi
 Syed Safdar Hussain Najafi
 Rana Mehboob Akhtar

Artist 

 Pathanay Khan, Singer
 Tauqeer Nasir, Actor

Sports
 Azhar Hussain, wrestler
 Milkha Singh, Indian track and field sprinter

Rulers
 Nawab Muzaffar Khan, founder of Muzaffargarh
 Tahir Khan Nahar Chief of vast terrioty at Seet pur, Muzaffargarh,

Politicians

 Abdul Hamid Khan Dasti
 Abdul Qayyum Khan Jatoi
 Amjad Hameed Khan Dasti
 Ghulam Murtaza Raheem Khar
 Ghulam Mustafa Khar, former Governor of Punjab and former Chief Minister of Punjab
 Ghulam Noor Rabbani Khar, politician
 Hammad Nawaz Khan
 Hina Rabbani Khar, former Foreign Minister and the first female foreign minister
 Nawabzada Iftakhar Ahmed Khan Babar- PPPP MNA from NA-184 Muzaffargarh-IV
 Jamshed Dasti, politician
 Liaqat Baloch, politician
 Malik Ahmad Karim Qaswar Langrial
 Mohsin Ali Qureshi
 Mushtaq Ahmed Gurmani, former governor of West Pakistan
 Nawabzada Nasrullah Khan, A prominent political figure in Pakistan
 Shabbir Ali Qureshi
 Safina Saima Khar
 Sardar Aabad Dogar, Ex Tehsil Nazim
 Sardar Ashiq Hussain, politician
 Sultan Mehmood, politician
 Tehmina Dasti

Members of the 15th National Assembly of Pakistan
 Muhammad Shabbir Ali -  PTI MNA from NA-181 Muzaffargarh-I
 Mahar Irshad Ahmad Khan - PPPP MNA from NA-182 Muzaffargarh-II
 Malik Ghulam Raza Rabbani Khar PPPP MNA from NA-183 Muzaffargarh-III
 Sardar Aamir Talal Khan Gopang - PTI MNA From NA-186 Muzaffargarh-VI
 Syed Basit Sultan Bukhari - PTI MNA from NA-185 Muzaffargarh-V

Members of the 17th Provincial Assembly of the Punjab
 Malik Ghulam Qasim Hanjra - PMLN - 268 - Muzaffargarh-I
 Azhar Abbas Chandia - PMLN - 269 - Muzaffargarh-II
 Abdul Hayi Dasti - PTI - 270 - Muzaffargarh-III
  Nawabzada Mansoor Ahmed Khan - PTI - 271 - Muzaffargarh-IV
 Zehra Batool - PTI - 272 - Muzaffargarh-V
 Syed Muhammad Sibtain Raza - PTI- 273 - Muzaffargarh-VI
 Muhammad Raza Hussain Bukhari - PTI - 274 - Muzaffargarh-VII
 Khurrum Sohail Khan Laghari - PTI - 275 - Muzaffargarh-VIII
 Muhammad Aoon Hamid - PTI - 276 - Muzaffargarh-IX
 Mian Alamdar Abbas Qureshi - PTI - 277 - Muzaffargarh-X
 Niaz Hussain Khan - PTI - 278 - Muzaffargarh-XI
 Muhammad Ashraf Khan Rind - PTI - 279 - Muzaffargarh-XII

Others
 Sardar Kaure Khan Jatoi, leading personality for his social services
 Dewan Prem Chand, Indian Army officer
 Afrasiab Mehdi Hashmi, Pakistani diplomat and author
 Mukhtar Mai, human rights activist 
 Mahendra Lal Wadhwa,  Indian freedom fighter 
 Zohra Shah - killed for mistakenly releasing her masters’ parrots.

References

 01
Muzaffargarh-related lists
Muzaffargarh
Muzaffargarh